Michael Decker may refer to:

 Michael P. Decker (born 1944), former member of the North Carolina General Assembly
 Michael H. Decker, current Assistant to the Secretary of Defense for Intelligence Oversight
 Michael Decker, historian known for his views on the Arab Agricultural Revolution